Maurice De Bevere (1 December 1923 – 16 July 2001), better known as Morris, was a Belgian cartoonist, comics artist, illustrator and the creator of Lucky Luke, a bestselling comic series about a gunslinger in the American Wild West. He was inspired by the adventures of the historic Dalton Gang and other outlaws. It was a bestselling series for more than 50 years that was translated into 23 languages and published internationally. He collaborated for two decades with French writer René Goscinny on the series. Morris's pen name is an Anglicized version of his first name.

Biography
Born in Kortrijk, Belgium, Morris attended the well-known Jesuit college in Aalst. His math teacher told his parents the youth would unfortunately never succeed in life, as he passed math classes doodling in the margin of his math books. The student uniforms required there inspired his choices for those of the undertakers in his Lucky Luke cartoon series. 

Morris started his career after college drawing in the Compagnie Belge d'Actualités (CBA) animation studios. This was a small and short-lived Belgian animation studio, where he met fellow artists Peyo, André Franquin and Eddy Paape. 

After World War II, the company folded. Morris worked as an illustrator for Het Laatste Nieuws, a Flemish newspaper, and Le Moustique, a French-language weekly magazine published by Dupuis. He made some 250 covers and numerous other illustrations for the latter magazine, mainly caricatures of movie stars.

Morris died in 2001 of an embolism following an accidental fall.

Lucky Luke
In 1946, Morris created Lucky Luke for Spirou magazine, the Franco-Belgian comics magazine published by Dupuis. Lucky Luke is a solitary cowboy who travels across the Wild West, helping those in need and aided by his faithful horse, Jolly Jumper. The first adventure, "Arizona 1880", was published in L'Almanach Spirou 1947, released on 7 December 1946.

Morris became one of the central artists of the magazine. He was one of the so-called La bande des quatre (Gang of Four), with Jijé, André Franquin, and Will. All four lived and worked for a couple of years at Jijé's studio in Waterloo, and became very good friends, stimulating each other artistically.

In 1948, Morris, Jijé and Franquin travelled to the United States (Will was still too young and had to remain in Belgium). They wanted to get to know the country, see what was left of the Wild West, and meet some American comic artists. Morris stayed the longest of the three, for six years. During his six-year stay in the U.S. Morris met Jack Davis and Harvey Kurtzman, and assisted them with founding their Mad magazine at EC Comics. In the U.S. he also met René Goscinny, a French comic artist and writer. 

They developed a long collaboration, and Goscinny wrote all the Lucky Luke stories between 1955 and his death in 1977. In the 1950s, Goscinny was still fairly unknown, but he became the most successful comic writer in Europe, first with Lucky Luke and a few years later with his Asterix series.

Morris's time in the United States were integral to his development, not only because of his collaboration with Goscinny, but because he gathered a great deal of documentation for his later work. He also became familiar with the Hollywood films of the time. In the following years, Morris introduced many cinematic techniques in his comics, such as freeze-frames and close-ups. Walt Disney's style influenced him, which can be seen in the very round lines that characterize the early Lucky Luke albums. Many characters in his comics are also clearly based on famous American actors, such as Jack Palance, Gary Cooper, W.C. Fields, and William Hart. He also caricatured unexpected figures, such as Louis de Funès and French singer Serge Gainsbourg.

The first 31 Lucky Luke adventures were published by Dupuis. In the late 1960s, Morris left Dupuis and Spirou and went to Dargaud and Pilote magazine. This was started by his friend and collaborator Goscinny.

In 1983, Hanna-Barbera made a series of 52 cartoons of Lucky Luke, increasing the popularity of the series. 52 more animated cartoons were made in the early 1990s, and three live action films followed. A few videogames based on the series were also made, e.g. for PlayStation and Game Boy Color. Lucky Luke is the best-selling European comics series ever, with more than 300 million copies sold, and published in more than thirty languages.

Unlike many of his contemporaries, Morris never worked on several series . He made numerous illustrations for stories in the 1940s and 1950s. In the 1990s, he did make Rantanplan, a spin-off from Lucky Luke, starring the dumbest dog in the West.

In 2005 Morris was ranked as 79th for The Greatest Belgian in the French-speaking community.

Awards
1972: Grand Prix Saint-Michel, Brussels, Belgium
1992: Angoulême International Comics Festival, 20th anniversary Grand Prix de la ville d'Angoulême

References

External links
 Biography on Dupuis.com
 Morris on Telegraph.co.uk
 Morris publications in Spirou and Pilote BDoubliées 
 Morris albums Bedetheque 
 Morris publications in English www.europeancomics.net 
 His profile in Lambiek Comiclopedia

1923 births
2001 deaths
20th-century Belgian artists
21st-century Belgian artists
20th-century Belgian writers
21st-century Belgian writers
20th-century Belgian male writers
21st-century Belgian male writers
Belgian comics artists
Belgian comics writers
Belgian cartoonists
Belgian humorists
Belgian illustrators
Belgian caricaturists
People from Kortrijk
Deaths from pulmonary embolism
Lucky Luke
Grand Prix de la ville d'Angoulême winners
Belgian expatriates in the United States